The Yellow Squadron (Swedish: Gula divisionen) is a 1954 romantic drama film directed by Stig Olin and starring Lars Ekborg, Hasse Ekman and Ann-Marie Gyllenspetz. It was released in the wake of the Korean War, set at the Svea Air Force Wing (F 8), just north of Stockholm and revolves around a fighter squadron of J 29 aircraft.

It was shot at the Centrumateljéerna Studios in Stockholm and on location at the Barkaby Air Force Base. The film's sets were designed by the art director Nils Nilsson.

Cast
 Hasse Ekman as Birger Wreting
 Ann-Marie Gyllenspetz as 	Sonja
 Sven Lindberg as 	Lieutenant Hagberg
 Lars Ekborg as 	Dag Holm
 Gertrud Fridh as Inger Bart-Wreting
 Stig Olin as Boman
 Karl-Arne Holmsten as 	Field Officer
 John Elfström as 	Holm
 Kåre Santesson as 	Arne Bart 
 Mona Malm as 	Berit
 Hans Sackemark as 	Olsson
 Meg Westergren as 	Ulla
 Torsten Lilliecrona as 	Doctor
 Doreen Denning as 	Actress 
 Siv Ericks as 	Actress 
 Mona Geijer-Falkner as 	A Mother 
 Stig Gustavsson as 	Ström - Wreting's Mechanic 
 Ingvar Kjellson as Actor 
 Gertie Lindgren as 	Waitress 
 Rune Lindkvist as 	Actor 
 Gösta Prüzelius as 	Drunk 
 Birger Sahlberg as Svensson - Janitor 
 Hanny Schedin as 	A Mother 
 Rune Stylander as 	Drunk 
 Bengt Sundmark as Joel Alm - Dag's Mechanic 
 Ann-Marie Tistler	as Olsson's Sister 
 Brita Ulfberg as 	Waitress

References

Bibliography 
 Qvist, Per Olov & von Bagh, Peter. Guide to the Cinema of Sweden and Finland. Greenwood Publishing Group, 2000.

External links 
 

1954 films
Swedish aviation films
Films directed by Stig Olin
Swedish adventure films
1954 drama films
Swedish drama films
1950s Swedish-language films
Films set in Stockholm
Films based on Swedish novels
1950s Swedish films